Horse railway may refer to:
 Horsecar
 Plateway
 Wagonway
 Horse drawn railway